This is an incomplete list that shows the awards and nominations received by South Korean artist Kim Hyun-joong.


Awards and nominations

Listicles

References

Kim Hyun-joong
SS501